HNoMS Viking was a 1. class gunboat built for the Royal Norwegian Navy. Like the other Norwegian gunboats of her era, she carried a heavy armament on a diminutive hull. The vessel was built at the Naval Yard at Horten, and had yard number 72.

Viking served with the Royal Norwegian Navy until stricken in 1920. Later she was used as a hospital ship by the Norwegian Red Cross.

References

 Naval history via Flix: KNM Viking, retrieved 17 March 2006
 Viking (First Class Gunboat, 1891-1920), retrieved 17 March 2006

Ships built in Horten
1.-class gunboats
1891 ships
Hospital ships